Roberto Rojas Tardío (born 26 October 1955 – 27 September 1991) was a Peruvian football defender who played for Peru in the 1978 FIFA World Cup.

Career
Rojas earned 27 caps for Peru between 1978 and 1983. He also played for Alianza Lima, Sporting Cristal and Deportivo Municipal. He died in a car crash in September 1991.

References

External links
 
FIFA profile

1955 births
1991 deaths
Footballers from Lima
Association football defenders
Peruvian footballers
Peru international footballers
Club Alianza Lima footballers
Sporting Cristal footballers
Deportivo Municipal footballers
1978 FIFA World Cup players
Road incident deaths in Peru